The 2008 Armenian Cup was the 17th edition of the Armenian Cup, a football competition. In 2008, the tournament had 14 participants, out of which 6 were reserve teams.

Summary
Banants and Ararat got a pass on the 1st round because these two clubs reached the final the previous year. The first round passed without any surprises, as the reserve teams were expected to be knocked out. The quarter finals, however, turned out to be very interesting. Two of the matches had to be decided on penalties. Gandzasar put up quite a fight against defending Armenian Premier League champions Pyunik, and even managed to outplay the champions in various aspects of the game. Shirak also demonstrated a fighting spirit and managed to defeat defending cup holders Banants away, after losing the first leg at home. Luck turned Banants' way as the match was won only on penalties. The semifinals  also turned out to be interesting as Banants and Ararat defeated Mika and Pyunik respectively with an aggregate score of 5-1. The final was a repeat of last year's final and this time it was Ararat that edged out on top as Marcos Pizzeli managed to sneak a late extra-time winner for the five-time Armenian Independence Cup winners. The victory gave Ararat an opportunity to participate in the 2008–09 UEFA Cup, First qualifying round.

Results

First round
The first legs were played on 21 March 2008. The second legs were played on 28 March 2008.

|}

Quarter-finals
The first legs were played on 3 April 2008. The second legs were played on 10 April 2008.

|}

Semi-finals
The first legs were played on 14 April 2008. The second legs were played on 23 April 2008.

|}

Final

See also
 2008 Armenian Premier League
 2008 Armenian First League

External links
  Official site
 Armenia Cup 2008 at Soccerway.com
 Armenia Cup 2008 at rsssf.com

Armenian Cup seasons
Armenia
Armenian Cup, 2008